A Submarine Escape Training Tower is a facility used for training submariners in methods of emergency escape from a disabled submarine underwater. It is a deep tank filled with water with at least one underwater entrance at depth simulating an airlock in a submarine. Since the 1930s, towers have been built for use by the Royal Navy, US Navy, Royal Australian Navy and in several other countries.

Royal Navy SETT

The SETT has its own dedicated boiler house to maintain its water temperature at 34 °C (94 °F). The SETT was commissioned in 1954, with the first students trained in July of that year. Since that time completion of ‘the Tank’ has been a rite of passage for all RN Submariners. Training includes ascents from increasing depths as a major element, but in addition is underpinned by lectures and practical training in how to survive within a disabled submarine, operation of emergency equipment and survival techniques on reaching the surface – a package of potentially life saving skills. Over the years, the SETT has been used to train submariners from Italy, USA, Greece, Canada, Israel, Russia, Venezuela, Turkey, Australia and the Netherlands – with the staff and facility enjoying a worldwide reputation for excellence and good practice. Owing to a combination of increased safety associated with modern submarine design, submarines operating in areas where escape would be impossible with current equipment and the risks associated with the conduct of training, the RN discontinued pressurised submarine escape training in March 2009.

The staff at SETT are drawn from the ranks of the UK Submarine Service.  All members of SETT staff form part of the SMERAT (Submarine Escape and Rescue Advisory Team), some members form the UK SPAG (Submarine Parachute Assistance Group), and some form part of the UK contribution to the NSRS (LR5) Team. All staff are trained in advanced life-saving techniques and diving medicine.

Other uses

The tower was also privately hired to civilian diving clubs for the purpose of recreational diving and dive training. It was a popular 'novelty' dive amongst UK scuba divers since it allowed new trainees to extend their depth experience in a safe, controlled environment with good visibility and warm water temperature – two conditions that are in short supply in the UK. For similar reasons it was also used for freediving training, with participants including world record-holder Tanya Streeter. In addition, the SETT has been used frequently for both underwater equipment testing, and to support media activity – notably hosting Blue Peter on a number of occasions, with some presenters completing ascent training. It has also been used frequently as a situation assessment trials tank (SATT) for technical divers.

US Navy
US Navy escape towers were known as Escape Training Tanks. From the 1930s through the 1990s they were used for training in buoyant ascent, the Momsen lung, and the Steinke hood. The decommissioned tower on Ford Island, Hawaii, was built to train United States Navy Pacific Fleet submariners prior to World War II, and was converted for use as an airport control tower after the attack on Pearl Harbor. Across the harbor, the tower on Sub-Base Pearl Harbor was used between 1932 and 1983. Neither of the U.S. escape towers in Hawaii are in use. The towers were also used to train scuba equipped divers (SEALs) or Underwater Demolition Teams to access or egress the submarine during special operations. The tower once located on Naval Submarine Base New London was in use between 1930 and 1994 and has since been razed.

Other facilities
The German Navy operates a 36-metre-deep escape training pool, built in 1977, at Einsatzausbildungszentrum Schadensabwehr Marine (Damage Control Training Centre) in Neustadt in Holstein.

Since 2013 there is a submarine escape training tank situated next to non-profit swimming pool "Het Heersdiep" in Den Helder, The Netherlands. This tank is used by the Royal Netherlands Navy and also by other navy's from all over the world. The tower at Aquacentrum Den Helder can also be used by civilian diving clubs for recreational diving and dive training. It is also used for freediving training and for fire brigade diving training.

The South African Navy has a submarine escape training tank at the navy diving school at the SAS Simonsberg training unit in Simon's Town on the Cape Peninsula.

References

External links

Rescue Tank May End Sub Deaths, November 1930, Popular Science – two-page 1930 article on the new US Navy SETT in New London, Connecticut
Royal Navy Submarine School (RNSMS)
Submarine Escape Training Tank – Royal Navy website
International Submarine Escape & Rescue Office
UK-International Submarine Escape & Rescue Training
Horsea Island Dive Centre website
Dutch International Submarine Escape & rescue Training TRITON12

Royal Navy bases in Hampshire
Freediving
Underwater diving sites
Underwater diving procedures